Plithotaxis, from the Greek word "πλήΘος", denotes a crowd, swarm, or throng. In collective cellular migration, plithotaxis is the tendency for each individual cell within a monolayer to migrate along the local orientation of the maximal principal stress, or equivalently, minimal intercellular shear stress. Plithotaxis requires force transmission across many cell-cell junctions and therefore is an emergent property of the cell group.

Plithotaxis is found to hold at the level of both a subcellular grid point and an individual cell of a confluent monolayer, and the stresses must be tensile.

See also
 Chemotaxis
 Durotaxis
 Haptotaxis
 Mechanotaxis

References

Cell biology
Physiology
Signal transduction
Emergence